Großherzogin Elisabeth is a 1909 German sailing ship built as the San Antonio, a replacement for the 1907 freighter San Antonio which had been lost in a collision at sea.

On 25 January 1914, San Antonio ran aground off the coast of Morocco. In 1929 she capsized near Copenhagen, Denmark; however, she was salvageable and was converted into a coastal trading vessel.

San Antonio was bought from Skillinge in November 1965 by Werner Sandberg. Her new home port was Hovenäset, Sweden. The skipper was Jan Sandberg. San Antonio operated the Baltic Sea and North Sea freight. She is the world's first motor sailor with a diesel engine. On 8 November 1973 she was acquired by the German shipowner Hartmut Paschburg and was a cruise ship on the Mediterranean for several years, operating with the name Ariadne.

In 1982, the ship was sold to the Kreis of Wesermarsch and the sail training club Schulschiffverein "Großherzogin Elisabeth" e. V. was founded. Since 1993, the club has been owner of the ship.

Today, Großherzogin Elisabeth is primarily used for sail training and is based in Elsfleth.

See also
List of large sailing vessels

References

External links
 
 Official site 

Training ships of Germany
Schooners
Tall ships of Germany
Individual sailing vessels
1909 ships
Maritime incidents in January 1914
Maritime incidents in 1929
Ships built in the Netherlands